Drawdown may refer to:

 Drawdown (book), 2017 book by Paul Hawken about climate change mitigation
 Drawdown (climate), the point at which greenhouse gas concentrations in the atmosphere begin to decline
 Drawdown (economics), decline in the value of an investment, below its all-time high
 Drawdown (hydrology), a lowering of a reservoir or a change in hydraulic head in an aquifer, typically due to pumping a well
 Drawdown card, used for testing paints and coatings through wet film preparation
 Drawdown chart, paper used to test various coating properties
 Income drawdown, a method withdrawing benefits from a UK Registered Pension Scheme

See also
 Capital call, finance term, also known as a draw down
 Reduction (disambiguation)